Cribraria is a genus of slime molds from the group of Myxogastria. It comprises about 30 species, some of which are extremely difficult to distinguish.

Features 

The fruiting bodies are usually pedunculated sporangia, a calyculus may be present or absent. The delicate peridium is reduced to a structure of vertical, thickened threads that are interconnected by extremely fine, translucent transverse threads. In some cases, however, the peridium may also appear like a net, as in  Cribraria  - species. Mostly dark, clearly visible dictydine granules are found especially close to the ribs of the peridia, the calyculus and the spores.

Distribution 
The genus is distributed worldwide, about two-thirds of the species are, however, [neotropic] ch. Many of their species are common in the respective distribution areas.

Systematics and Research History 
The genus was first described in 1794 by Christiaan Hendrik Persoon, type species is  Cribraria rufescens .

The genus includes at least 30 species, including:

Species

Cribraria angulospora
Cribraria argillacea
Cribraria atrofusca
Cribraria aurantiaca
Cribraria cancellata
Cribraria confusa
Cribraria costata
Cribraria cribrarioides
Cribraria dictyospora
Cribraria elegans
Cribraria enodis
Cribraria exigua
Cribraria ferruginea
Cribraria filiformis
Cribraria fragilis
Cribraria intricata
Cribraria irregularis
Cribraria languescens
Cribraria laxa
Cribraria lepida
Cribraria macrocarpa
Cribraria macrospora
Cribraria macrostipitata
Cribraria martinii
Cribraria media
Cribraria meylanii
Cribraria microcarpa
Cribraria minutissima
Cribraria mirabilis
Cribraria oregana
Cribraria paucicostata
Cribraria paucidictyon
Cribraria persoonii
Cribraria pertenuis
Cribraria piriformis
Cribraria purpurea
Cribraria rubiginosa
Cribraria rufa
Cribraria rutila
Cribraria splendens
Cribraria stellifera
Cribraria tecta
Cribraria tenella
Cribraria violacea
Cribraria vulgaris
Cribraria zonatispora

References

Myxogastria
Amoebozoa genera